Heinrich Kuhl (17 September 1797 – 14 September 1821) was a German naturalist and zoologist.

Kuhl was born in Hanau (Hesse, Germany).  Between 1817 and 1820, he was the assistant of professor Th. van Swinderen, docent natural history at the University of Groningen in Groningen (the Netherlands). In 1817, he published a monograph on bats, and in 1819, he published a survey of the parrots, Conspectus psittacorum. He also published the first monograph on the petrels, and a list of all the birds illustrated in Daubenton's Planches Enluminées and with his friend Johan Coenraad van Hasselt (1797–1823) Beiträge zur Zoologie und vergleichenden Anatomie ("Contributions to Zoology and Comparative Anatomy") that were published at Frankfurt-am-Main, 1820. 

In 1820, he became assistant to Coenraad Jacob Temminck at the Leiden Rijksmuseum van Natuurlijke Historie. He then travelled to Java, then part of the colonial Netherlands East Indies, with his friend van Hasselt, to study the animals of the island, sending back to the museum at Leiden 200 skeletons, 200 mammal skins of 65 species, 2000 bird skins, 1400 fish, 300 reptiles and amphibians, and many insects and crustaceans.

He described many new species and new genera of amphibians and reptiles.

In 1821, he died in Buitenzorg (now Bogor) of a liver infection brought on by the climate and overexertion. He had been less than a year in Java. Johan van Hasselt continued his work collecting specimens, but died two years later. The partners are buried in a single grave in the Botanical Garden, Bogor, marked with a small column.

Legacy
Several species have been named to commemorate his work as naturalist and zoologist:

Fishes
Blue-spotted stingray or Kuhl's stingray, Neotrygon kuhlii
Kuhl's loach or kuhli loach, Pangio kuhlii
Kuhlia, a genus of marine fish, flagtail

Herpetofauna
Kuhl's creek frog or large-headed frog, Limnonectes kuhlii, found in Southeast Asia
Kuhl's forest dragon, Gonocephalus kuhli, a lizard found in Indonesia
Kuhl's flying gecko, Ptychozoon kuhli, a gecko found in Southeast Asia

Birds
Rimatara lorikeet or Kuhl's lorikeet, Vini kuhlii lorikeet in islands of the South Pacific

Mammals
Axis kuhlii, Bawean deer
Callithrix kuhlii
Eptesicus kuhli, synonym of Eptesicus nilssonii
Pipistrellus kuhlii, Kuhl's pipistrelle
Sciurillus pusillus kuhlii
Scotophilus kuhlii

See also
List of herpetologists
:Category:Taxa named by Heinrich Kuhl

References

Further reading
Walters, Michael (2003). A Concise History of Ornithology. New Haven: Yale University Press. .

External links
BHL Text of Beiträge zur Zoologie und vergleichenden Anatomie. (in German).

German entomologists
German ornithologists
German taxonomists
1797 births
1821 deaths
deaths in Indonesia
People from Hanau
19th-century German zoologists